DAG is an American sitcom that aired from November 14, 2000 to May 29, 2001 on NBC. It was named after its star, David Alan Grier, who stars as United States Secret Service agent Jerome Daggett. Daggett's name, in turn, is a back-formation. The show also stars Delta Burke as the First Lady of the United States of America.

Synopsis
After making a mistake during a failed assassination attempt on the President (David Rasche), Agent Daggett is reassigned to protect the First Lady. Agent Daggett encounters problems with the First Lady (Delta Burke) who treats him like a servant instead of her body guard. He also has problems with an egotistical fellow agent, Edward Pillows (Stephen Dunham), the First Lady's secretary Ginger Chin (Lauren Tom), and the First couple's beautiful young daughter Camilla (Lea Moreno Young).

The series was originally scheduled on NBC's Tuesday night sitcom line up following 3rd Rock from the Sun at 9:30 EST. In January 2001, the series was moved to 8:30 timeslot, but was canceled the following May after one season.

Cast
 David Alan Grier as Secret Service Agent Jerome "Dag" Daggett
 Delta Burke as First Lady Judith Whitman
 David Rasche as President Whitman
 Stephen Dunham as Agent Edward Pillows
 Mel Jackson as Secret Service Agent Morton
 Emmy Laybourne as Agent Susan Cole
 Lauren Tom as Secretary Ginger Chin
 Paul F. Tompkins as Chief of Staff Sullivan Pope
 Lea Moreno Young as Camilla Whitman

Episodes

Reception
Robert Bianco of USA Today said it "should have been funnier but wasn't a total star vehicle disaster like "Bette" or "The Michael Richards Show"."
Hal Boedeker of the Orlando Sentinel said it was "Flat, old-fashioned DAG wastes David Alan Grier and Delta Burke -- an impeachable comedy offense."

Award nominations

References

External links
 
 

2000 American television series debuts
2001 American television series endings
2000s American black sitcoms
English-language television shows
NBC original programming
Television shows set in Washington, D.C.
Television series by Universal Television